This is an incomplete list of Stirling Albion Football Club seasons up to the present day. The list details Stirling's record in major league and cup competitions, and the club's top league goal scorer of each season where available. Top scorers in bold were also the top scorers in Stirling's division that season. Records of competitions such as the Stirlingshire Cup are not included.

Seasons

Key

 P = Played
 W = Games won
 D = Games drawn
 L = Games lost
 F = Goals for
 A = Goals against
 Pts = Points
 Pos = Final position

 GS = Group stage
 R1 = Round 1
 R2 = Round 2
 R3 = Round 3
 R4 = Round 4
 R5 = Round 5
 R6 = Round 6
 QF = Quarter-finals
 SF = Semi-finals
 L1 = Scottish League One
 L2 = Scottish League Two
 Div 1 = Scottish First Division
 Div 2 = Scottish Second Division
 Div 3 = Scottish Third Division
 Div A = Scottish Division A
 Div B = Scottish Division B
 Div C = Scottish Division C

Notes

References

Seasons
 
Stirling Albion